Parachanna insignis is a species of ray-finned fish from the snakehead family, Channidae from western central Africa.

References

insignis
Fish described in 1884